Giovanni Jeannot (born 13 October 1982) is a Mauritian footballer who currently plays as a striker for AS Port-Louis 2000. He won 20 caps for the Mauritius national football team between 2004 and 2007.

References

1982 births
Living people
Mauritian footballers
Mauritius international footballers
Association football forwards
Mauritian Premier League players
AS Port-Louis 2000 players